The Klinaklini Glacier is a glacier west of the Klinaklini River and head of Knight Inlet the Coast Land District of British Columbia, Canada (51° 28′ 0″ N, 125° 47′ 0″ W). It flows generally southward from Mt. Silverthrone. The glacier is one of the largest glaciers in western North America. The Hakai Institute has installed a weather station and camera above Klinaklini Glacier that will provide data in near real time to scientists and operational users.

References

Glaciers of the Pacific Ranges
Central Coast of British Columbia